The chancellor of the University of Illinois Springfield is the principal administrative officer of the university and a member of the faculty of each of its colleges, schools, institutes and divisions. The chancellor is appointed by the Board of Trustees following nomination by the president of the University of Illinois System. The chancellor performs those duties that are assigned by the president and that are consistent with the actions of the Board of Trustees. The chancellor is assisted by vice-chancellors for academic affairs, administrative affairs, campus affairs, and research. Naomi B. Lynn served as the first chancellor in 1995, and there have been 5 chancellors in total. The current chancellor is Janet L. Gooch, who has held the position since July 1, 2022.

On February 28, 1995, Governor Jim Edgar signed a bill reorganizing higher education in Illinois, which in the process abolished the Board of Regents of Sangamon State University (SSU) and merged SSU with the University of Illinois System. On July 1, SSU officially became the University of Illinois Springfield. Naomi B. Lynn, the last president of SSU, continued as the new university's first chancellor.

List of chancellors

Timeline of chancellorships

See also
 List of chancellors of the University of Illinois Chicago
 List of chancellors of the University of Illinois Urbana-Champaign
 List of presidents of the University of Illinois system

Notes

References

 
Illinois, University of, Springfield
Illinois, University of, Springfield
University of Illinois at Springfield